Paschim Medinipur district is one of the districts of the state of West Bengal, India. It was formed on 1 January 2002 after the Partition of Midnapore into Paschim Medinipur and Purba Medinipur. On 4 April 2017, the Jhargram subdivision was converted into a district. GDP of West Midnapore district is 12 billion USD.

Geography
Paschim Medinipur, located in the south-western part of West Bengal, was created with the partition of the erstwhile Midnapore district, then the largest district of India, on 1 January 2002. It ranks second in terms of geographical area (9,295.28  km2) amongst the districts of the state, next to South 24-Parganas (9,960  km2). It ranks third in terms of rural population (4.58 million) following South 24-Parganas (5.82 million) and Murshidabad (5.13 million). It ranked fourth in terms of percentage of tribal population (14.87) following Jalpaiguri (18.87), Purulia (18.27) and Dakshin Dinajpur (16.12) in 2011.

Broadly speaking, there are two natural divisions of the district. NH 14 and NH 16 (old numbering NH 60) from Bankura to Balasore, cuts across the district and roughly is the dividing line between the two natural divisions. To the east of this road, the soil is fertile alluvial and the area is flat. To the west, the Chota Nagpur Plateau gradually slopes down creating an undulating area with infertile laterite rocks and soil. The landscape changes from dense dry deciduous forests in the west to marshy wetlands in the east.

The alluvial portion may be further subdivided into two divisions. First, it is a strip of purely deltaic country nearer to the Hooghly and the Rupnarayan, intersected by numerous rivers and watercourses subject to tidal influences. Second, it is rest of the eastern half of the district. It is a monotonous rice plain with numerous waterways and tidal creeks intersecting it. The tidal creeks are lined with embankments to prevent flooding of the fields. Much of the area is water-logged.

Floods and drought
Paschim Medinipur district is subject to both floods and drought. Water logging during the rainy season affects Ghatal and the southern parts of Kharagpur subdivision and results in loss of crops in such areas as Sabang, Pingla and Narayangarh CD Blocks. Medinipur Sadar subdivision is drought prone. Although the district is away from the sea, cyclones hit it frequently in October–November.

Major cities and towns
Midnapore is the district headquarters. Kharagpur is the largest city in the district. Other important towns and cities in the district include: Kharagpur, Ghatal, Belda, Chandrakona, Ramjibanpur, Garbeta, Balichak, Dantan, Mohanpur, Keshiari, Keshpur, Narayangarh, Sabang, Daspur.Goaltore, Debra

Villages
Paschim Medinipur district is home to the most villages of any district in India. The 2011 census lists Paschim Medinipur as having 8,694 villages, of which 7,600 are populated, and 1,094 are uninhabited. The district with the next highest number of villages, Mayurbhanj, in the state of Odisha, has 3,950 villages, 3,751 of which are inhabited.
 

Jahalda
Narma
Pachakhali

Economy and politics
In 2006 the Ministry of Panchayati Raj named Paschim Medinipur one of the country's 250 most backward districts (out of a total of 640). It is one of the eleven districts in West Bengal currently receiving funds from the Backward Regions Grant Fund Programme (BRGF).

106 districts spanning 10 states across India, described as being part of Left Wing Extremism activities, constitute the Red corridor. In West Bengal the districts of Paschim Medinipur, Bankura, Purulia and Birbhum are part of the Red corridor. However, as of July 2016, there has been no reported incidents of Maoist related activities from these districts for the previous 4 years. In the period 2009–2011 LWE violence resulted in more than 500 deaths and a similar number missing in Paschim Medinipur district.

Divisions
Paschim Medinipur district is divided into the following administrative subdivisions:

Administrative subdivisions
The district comprises three subdivisions: Kharagpur, Medinipur Sadar and Ghatal. Kharagpur subdivision consists of Kharagpur municipality and ten community development blocks: Dantan–I, Dantan–II, Pingla, Kharagpur–I, Kharagpur–II, Sabang, Mohanpur, Narayangarh, Keshiari and Debra. Medinipur Sadar subdivision consists of Midnapore municipality and six community development blocks: Medinipur Sadar, Garhbeta–I, Garhbeta–II, Garhbeta–III, Keshpur and Shalboni. Ghatal subdivision consists of five municipalities (Ramjibanpur, Chandrakona, Khirpai, Kharar and Ghatal) and five community development blocks: Chandrakona–I, Chandrakona–II, Daspur–I, Daspur–II and Ghatal.

Midnapore is the district headquarters. There are 28 police stations, 21 development blocks, 7 municipalities and 290 gram panchayats in this district.

Other than municipality area, each subdivision contains community development blocks which in turn are divided into rural areas and census towns. In total there are 11 urban units: 7 municipalities and 4 census towns.

Kharagpur subdivision
 One municipality: Kharagpur.
 Dantan I community development block consists of rural areas with 9 gram panchayats and one census town: Chaulia
 Dantan II community development block consists of rural areas only with 7 gram panchayats.
 Pingla community development block consists of rural areas only with 10 gram panchayats.
 Kharagpur I community development block consists of rural areas with 7 gram panchayats and two census towns: Kharagpur Railway Settlement and Kalaikunda.
 Kharagpur II community development block consists of rural areas only with 9 gram panchayats.
 Sabang community development block consists of rural areas only with 13 gram panchayats.
 Mohanpur community development block consists of rural areas only with 5 gram panchayats.
 Narayangarh community development block consists of rural areas with 16 gram panchayats and one census town: Deuli.
 Keshiari community development block consists of only rural areas with 9 gram panchayats. 
 Debra community development block consists of rural areas with 14 gram panchayats and one census town: Balichak.

Medinipur Sadar subdivision
 One municipality: Midnapore.
 Midnapore Sadar community development block consists of rural areas only with 9 gram panchayats.
 Garhbeta I community development block consists of rural areas with 12 gram panchayats and two census towns: Garbeta and Amlagora
 Garhbeta II community development block consists of rural areas only with 10 gram panchayats.
 Garhbeta III community development block consists of rural areas with 8 gram panchayats and three census towns: Durllabhganj, Dwari Geria and Naba Kola.
 Keshpur community development block consists of rural areas only with 15 gram panchayats.
 Salboni community development block consists of rural areas only with 10 gram panchayats.

Ghatal subdivision
 Five municipalities: Ramjibanpur, Chandrakona, Khirpai, Kharar and Ghatal.
 Chandrakona I community development block consists of rural areas only with 6 gram panchayats.
 Chandrakona II community development block consists of rural areas only with 6 gram panchayats.
 Daspur I community development block consists of rural areas only with 10 gram panchayats.
 Daspur II community development block consists of rural areas only with 14 gram panchayats.
 Ghatal community development block consists of rural areas only with 12 gram panchayats.

Assembly Constituencies
There are 15 assembly constituencies in Paschim Medinipur district. They belong to four Lok Sabha constituencies. Medinipur and Ghatal constituencies both comprise six constituencies of Paschim Medinipur district and one from Purba Medinipur district. Jhargram constituency contains two constituencies of Paschim Medinipur district, while Arambagh contains one constituency.

Demographics

According to the 2011 census Paschim Medinipur district has a population of 5,913,457, roughly equal to the nation of Eritrea or the US state of Missouri. This gives it a ranking of 14th in India (out of a total of 640). Its population growth rate over the decade 2001–2011 was 14.44%. Paschim Medinipur has a sex ratio of 960 females for every 1000 males, and a literacy rate of 79.04%. After bifurcation the district had a population of 4,776,909. In the divided district, Scheduled Castes and Scheduled Tribes make up 892,763 (18.69%) and 546,167 (11.43%) of the population respectively.

Religion 

Hindus are the majority population.

Language

At the time of the 2011 census, 87.15% spoke Bengali, 6.29% Santali and 2.49% Hindi as their first language. Other languages spoken in the district include Telugu, Urdu and Koda.

Culture

Tourism

 Patachitra Village (Naya, Pingla)
 Gopegarh Heritage Park
 Hatibari Forest banglow and Jhilli Pakhiralay
 Gurguripal Heritage Park
 Parimalkanan park, CKT
 Gangani Garhbeta
Kriya Yoga Ashram, Chaipat Satmatha
Raj Rajeswar Temple, Chaipat
 Rameshwar Temple, near Rohini (On the bank of Subarnarekha river with nearby green forest called Tapoban)
 Gourya Temple, near Kharagpur
 Bisnu Temple, Kultikri
 Rashikananda Memorial, Rohini
 Mogolmari Boudhabihar, Mogolmari, Dantan
 Prayag Film City, Midnapore Film City or Chandrakona Film City at Chandrakona Road

Notable people

 Tamal Bandyopadhyay, Indian business journalist 
 Rajnarayan Basu, writer and proponent of Young Bengal movement.He served as the headmaster of Midnapore Zilla School (later known as Midnapore Collegiate School) which was also the forerunner of Midnapore College.
 Anirban Bhattacharya, actor in Tollywood movies
 Khudiram Bose – Mohobani, situated under the Keshpur Police Station in the Medinipur. One of the youngest martyrs of the Indian Independence Movement.
 Soumya Sankar Bose – Midnapore
 Byomkes Chakrabarti, Linguist, writer and poet - Kharar & Jhargram
Souhardya De, Orientalist and Bal Puraskar recipient 2021
 Mahasweta Devi, writer and Magsaysay Award winner
 Nirmal Jibon Ghosh, revolutionary
 Hemchandra Kanungo, an Indian nationalist and a member of the Anushilan Samiti.He was one of the creators of the Calcutta flag, based on which the first flag of independent India
 Narayan Chandra Rana, Rana has left his mark in many branches of Astrophysics and in Amateur Astronomy in India.
 Satish Chandra Samanta, social activist
 Birendranath Sasmal, social activista lawyer and political leader. He was known as Deshpran because of his work for the country and for his efforts in the Swadeshi movement. He was born in Contai, in undivided Midnapore district.
 Huseyn Shaheed Suhrawardy, Chief Minister of Bengal during British period, Prime Minister of Pakistan and founder of the Awami League
 Ishwar Chandra Vidyasagar – Birsingha, a key figure of the Bengal Renaissance. He was a philosopher, academic educator, writer, translator, printer, publisher, entrepreneur, reformer and philanthropist.

Education

Universities and colleges

Ambigeria Government College
Belda College
Bhatter College
Chaipat S.P.B. Mahavidyalaya
Debra Thana Sahid Kshudiram Smriti Mahavidyalaya
Dr B C Roy Institute of Medical Sciences & Research
Garhbeta College
Gourav Guin Memorial College
Government General Degree College, Mohanpur
Government General Degree College, Keshiary
Hijli College
IIT Kharagpur
Institute of Science & Technology
K.D. College of Commerce and General Studies
Kharagpur College
Keshiary Government College
Kharagpur Homoeopathic Medical College and Hospital
Midnapore College (Autonomous) (formerly known as Day college)
Midnapore City College
Midnapore Homoeopathic Medical College and Hospital
Midnapore Law College
Midnapore Medical College and Hospital
Oriental Institute of Science and Technology
Narajole Raj College
Pingla Thana Mahavidyalaya
Raja Narendra Lal Khan Women's College
Sabang Sajanikanta Mahavidyalaya
Salboni Government College
Sankrail Anil Biswas Smriti Mahavidyalaya
Santal Bidroha Sardha Satabarsiki Mahavidyalaya
Medinipur Sadar Government Polytechnic
Sukumar Sengupta Mahavidyalaya
Vidyasagar Teachers' Training College, Midnapore
Vidyasagar University
Vivekananda Satavarshiki Mahavidyalaya

Healthcare
The table below (all data in numbers) presents an overview of the subdivision-wise medical facilities available and patients treated, after the separation of Jhargram, in the hospitals, health centres and sub-centres in 2014 in Paschim Medinipur district.
 

Excluding nursing homes

Notes

References

External links

 
 Map of old Medinipur district (district has now been split)
 
 
 

 
Districts of West Bengal